Hi-Res Computer Golf 2 is a 1982 video game published by Avant-Garde Creations for the Apple II.

Gameplay
Hi-Res Computer Golf 2 is a golf game which has a demonstration course, a practice hole and an 18-hole golf course for beginners.

Reception
Stanley Greenlaw reviewed the game for Computer Gaming World, and stated that "There is no doubt that this is the best golf simulation on the market. Any serious student of the game of golf will find in this game the mental challenges that he faces in the real thing as well as the need for practice to develop a "good swing" which is essential to the actual game."

References

External links
1984 Software Encyclopedia from Electronic Games
Review in Softalk
Review in Electronic Games
Review in GAMES Magazine

1982 video games
Apple II games
Apple II-only games
Golf video games
Video games developed in the United States